Clair Walter Burgener (December 5, 1921 – September 9, 2006) was an American politician who served as a Republican member of the U.S. House of Representatives from 1973 to 1983.

Early life
Clair Burgener was born in Vernal, Utah, and grew up there and in Salt Lake City. He served in the Pacific in the Army Air Corps during World War II as a navigator. He attained second lieutenant and was awarded the Air Medal in 1945. Later, he was recalled for Air Force service during the Korean War.

Burgener graduated from San Diego State College with a BA in liberal arts. He was a realtor in the early 1950s with his brother. In 1951 Burgener was on the stage of the Old Globe Theatre in Balboa Park, playing Elwood P. Dowd in Harvey for a 33-day run.

Burgener was a Latter-day Saint.

Political life
At a cocktail party one evening, as related by Lionel Van Deerlin, an oilman from Texas said, "I like the cut of your jib, young fella." He continued, "If you do go into politics, I'd like to help. Here's a check for five thousand dollars. Cash it whenever you decide to run." A few months later, Burgener ran for a city council vacancy, but returned the check, writing, "Thank you very much, but I feel it would be improper to accept so large an amount from a single out-of-state contributor." 

Burgener was elected to the San Diego City Council in 1953, serving until 1957. On the city council he pushed for the development of Mission Bay Park. Burgener later recalled the office as "the job I enjoyed the least".

Burgener was then elected to the California State Assembly 1963–1967 and California State Senate, 1967–1973. Burgener later said his time in the State Capitol constituted his most productive and rewarding years. He was most proud of state legislation he pushed through in 1963 that mandated classroom training for the intellectually disabled.

Burgener was elected to five terms in the U.S. House of Representatives, from 1973 to 1983. He had a mostly conservative voting record, but often crossed party lines to work with Van Deerlin, a Democrat, to further San Diego interests.

In 1980, Ku Klux Klan leader Tom Metzger won the Democratic primary in Burgener's district, at that time the most populous Congressional district in the country. The Democrats, from Gov. Jerry Brown on down, disavowed Metzger and endorsed Burgener, clinching his election to a fifth term. Burgener dug up and publicized Metzger's frequent, ill-conceived statements and won the election with 86% of the vote, breaking a 40-year-old record for votes received in a House race. In 1982 he did not seek reelection and retired.

Post-political life
Burgener remained active in civic and political affairs after his retirement. He was a Regent of the University of California during 1988–1997. After Burgener's son Rod was diagnosed as developmentally disabled, Burgener became a champion of mentally-disabled children. He did much work for, and headed various associations and committees helping intellectually disabled children, including the Clair Burgener Foundation for the Developmentally Disabled.

After his retirement, Congressman Burgener lived at Rancho Santa Fe, California with his wife Marvia when he was diagnosed with Alzheimer's disease. Burgener died in 2006 in Encinitas, California. He and his wife were survived by two sons, John and Greg.

Legacy
Named for Burgener are the Clair Burgener Academy, Oceanside, California, the Clair Burgener Clinical Research Diagnostic Unit, University of California, San Diego.

References

External links

Our Campaigns – Representative Clair Burgener (CA) profile

Join California Clair Burgener

1921 births
2006 deaths
20th-century American politicians
Latter Day Saints from Utah
Republican Party California state senators
Deaths from Alzheimer's disease
Deaths from dementia in California
Republican Party members of the California State Assembly
Republican Party members of the United States House of Representatives from California
Military personnel from Utah
People from Vernal, Utah
Politicians from San Diego
United States Air Force personnel of the Korean War
United States Army Air Forces personnel of World War II
United States Army Air Forces officers
United States Air Force officers
Recipients of the Air Medal
University of California regents
Latter Day Saints from California
Military personnel from California
20th-century American academics